Conoppia palmicinctum is a species of mite in the family Cepheidae. It has a southern European – Central Asian distribution, extending as far west as the Spanish Sierra Nevada and the Canary Islands. In the British Isles, it is found in South West England, South Wales and southern Ireland.

References

External links 
 
 Species-ID

Acariformes
Arachnids of Europe
Animals described in 1884